The 1900 United Kingdom general election in Ireland was held in September and October 1900. Ninety-nine of the seats were in single-member districts using the first-past-the-post electoral system, and the constituencies of Cork City and Dublin University were two-member districts using block voting.

This election was the first fought after the separate organisations in the Irish Parliamentary Party re-merged after a split in 1891 between the Irish National Federation, which had opposed the leadership of Charles Stewart Parnell, and the Irish National League, which had supported his continued leadership. The IPP was now led by John Redmond of the smaller INL.

In the overall election result, the coalition of the Conservative Party, which included the Irish Unionist Alliance, and the Liberal Unionist Party, was returned and the Marquess of Salisbury continued as Prime Minister.

Results

See also
 History of Ireland (1801–1923)

References

1895
Ireland
October 1900 events
1900 elections in Ireland